Milton Courts (now Frew Park) was a tennis venue located in Milton, Brisbane, Queensland, Australia. The complex consisted of 19 hard courts and four grass courts. The main arena seated 7,000 people and opened in 1915. Robert Dickson Alison Frew was the president of the Queensland Lawn Tennis Association (later Tennis Queensland) from 1910 to 1930. He was the driving force behind the creation of the tennis centre. It hosted eight Australian Open/Championships, including the first tournament where professionals were allowed in 1969. In addition, it staged three Davis Cup finals, in 1958, 1962, and 1967.

English rock band The Rolling Stones performed at the venue during their 1973 Pacific Tour on 14 February 1973.

The venue closed in 1999 because of heavy financial losses by Tennis Queensland. The land was sold in 2002 and the complex demolished.

In 2014, the site was redeveloped by the Brisbane City Council as Frew Park, a combined park and tennis centre. Frew Park was opened on 29 November 2014 and is named after Robert Frew. Frew Park is made up of  Roy Emerson Tennis Courts, Wendy Turnbull Green, Fay Muller Rebound Wall and is also home of the Stefan Tennis Racket. It is a key part of the Brisbane Tennis Trail.

Brisbane hairdresser Stefan Ackerie had rescued his  tennis racquet icon (based on the Aldila brand) that was originally over the Milton Tennis Centre when it was demolished (he had sponsored the Queensland Tennis Open competition at that site) and 15 years later in June 2014 had it re-erected over the Frew Park.

References

External links

 
Stadium information

Tennis venues in Australia
Sports venues in Brisbane
Milton, Queensland
Parks in Brisbane
1958 Davis Cup
1962 Davis Cup
1967 Davis Cup
Defunct sports venues in Australia
Demolished buildings and structures in Brisbane
Sports venues demolished in 2002
Demolished sports venues